Xerocnephasia is a genus of moths belonging to the subfamily Tortricinae of the family Tortricidae.

Species
Xerocnephasia rigana (Sodoffsky, 1829)

See also
List of Tortricidae genera

References

External links
Tortricid.net

Tortricidae genera
Cnephasiini